Janice Woon Khe Wei (born 18 March 1989) is a Malaysian former badminton player in the doubles event.

Career 
Her regular partner was Vivian Hoo. Together, they had ranked as high as No. 9 worldwide. They won the gold medal at the 2014 Commonwealth Games and they also reached the quarterfinals in the 2016 Olympics. She announced her retirement in December 2018, months after her last performance in the 2018 BWF World Championships.

Achievements

Commonwealth Games 
Women's doubles

Asian Games 
Women's doubles

Asian Championships 
Women's doubles

Southeast Asian Games 
Women's doubles

Asian Junior Championships 
Mixed doubles

BWF Grand Prix 
The BWF Grand Prix had two levels, the Grand Prix and Grand Prix Gold. It was a series of badminton tournaments sanctioned by the Badminton World Federation (BWF) and played between 2007 and 2017.

Women's doubles

  BWF Grand Prix Gold tournament
  BWF Grand Prix tournament

BWF International Challenge/Series 
Women's doubles

Mixed doubles

  BWF International Challenge tournament
  BWF International Series tournament

References

External links 
 
 
 

1989 births
Living people
People from Selangor
Malaysian sportspeople of Chinese descent
Malaysian female badminton players
Badminton players at the 2016 Summer Olympics
Olympic badminton players of Malaysia
Badminton players at the 2010 Asian Games
Badminton players at the 2014 Asian Games
Asian Games bronze medalists for Malaysia
Asian Games medalists in badminton
Medalists at the 2014 Asian Games
Badminton players at the 2010 Commonwealth Games
Badminton players at the 2014 Commonwealth Games
Commonwealth Games gold medallists for Malaysia
Commonwealth Games medallists in badminton
Competitors at the 2007 Southeast Asian Games
Competitors at the 2009 Southeast Asian Games
Competitors at the 2011 Southeast Asian Games
Competitors at the 2013 Southeast Asian Games
Competitors at the 2015 Southeast Asian Games
Competitors at the 2017 Southeast Asian Games
Southeast Asian Games gold medalists for Malaysia
Southeast Asian Games silver medalists for Malaysia
Southeast Asian Games bronze medalists for Malaysia
Southeast Asian Games medalists in badminton
University of Malaya alumni
21st-century Malaysian women
Medallists at the 2010 Commonwealth Games
Medallists at the 2014 Commonwealth Games